Richard Allen Craven (born May 24, 1966) is an American stock car racing analyst and former driver. Prior to his broadcasting duties, he was a NASCAR driver who won in four different series—the K&N Pro Series, and the three national series.

He occasionally served as a pit reporter when NASCAR aired on TBS in the mid-1990s. Craven is perhaps most well known for winning the 2003 Carolina Dodge Dealers 400, beating Kurt Busch in the closest finish in Cup Series history.

Personal
Craven graduated from Hampden Academy in Hampden, Maine.

Racing career

Beginnings
Craven began racing at the age of 15 at Unity Raceway, winning twice as well as the Rookie of the Year award. The next year, he won 12 feature events and the track championship. In 1984 Craven raced at Wiscasset Speedway in the Late Model Division; in this year he won the track championship along with the Rookie of the Year title. After that, he began running in the American Canadian Tour, where he had rampant success. In 1986, he made his NASCAR debut at Oxford Plains Speedway in his own No. 12, finishing 25th after suffering engine failure. Four years later, he began running the Busch North Series, winning the Rookie of the Year award. In 1991, he was named the champion in that series, winning ten times in the No. 25 Chevrolet, with two of those ten wins in "combination" races with the Busch Grand National Series, including the prestigious Oxford 250. In addition, he made his Winston Cup debut at Rockingham, starting and finishing 34th for Dick Moroso. He moved to the Busch Series full-time in 1992  in the No. 99 Chevy for Bill Papke, and once again was named Rookie of the Year. In 1993 and 1994, he finished runner-up to Steve Grissom and David Green, respectively, in the championship standings.  On October 9, 1994, Craven would serve as a pit reporter for TBS's broadcast of that year's Mello Yello 500, serving as a precursor to his broadcasting career.

1995–1998

In 1995, Craven teamed up with Larry Hedrick Motorsports and Kodiak to run for Winston Cup Rookie of the Year. Craven qualified for all 31 races, finished in the Top 10 four times, and was able to defeat Robert Pressley for the top rookie award. For his efforts, he was rewarded with a partial ownership share in the team. He began 1996 with three consecutive Top 10 finishes and his first career pole. He was fourth in points before the Winston Select 500, during which he was involved in a multi-car wreck. On lap 130, his car was launched into the air and impacted with the catch fence above the wall before being thrown back onto the track and hit by another car. This crash was similar to Jimmy Horton's barrel roll in 1993 where he cleared the track. Craven's flip completely sheared the catchfence off the turn and NASCAR threw a lengthy red flag to make repairs. He walked away, but fell to twentieth in points and only had one Top 5 finish and one pole for the rest of the season

At the end of the year, Craven left Hedrick to drive the No. 25 Chevy for Hendrick Motorsports. Craven finished in the Top 5 in the first two races of the season. He finished third in the 1997 Daytona 500 behind his teammates Terry Labonte in second and Jeff Gordon in first giving Hendrick Motorsports a 1-2-3  sweep of the Daytona 500. While practicing for the inaugural Interstate Batteries 500, Craven crashed hard into the wall. He missed two races due to a concussion suffered from the wreck. Upon his return, he won the Winston Open and finished a then-career-best 19th in points and a total of $1,139,860 in winnings for 1997. After the 1998 season started, the side effects of the concussion began to appear, and Craven was diagnosed with post-concussion syndrome, and was forced to miss several races until he recovered. He returned at his home track at New Hampshire International Speedway later that year won the pole. After four races, he was released permanently from Hendrick, and did not return until the final three races of the season, filling in for Ernie Irvan at MB2 Motorsports.

1999–2006
For 1999, Craven signed to drive the No. 58 Ford Taurus for Scott Barbour's SBIII Motorsports, a brand new team in NASCAR. He did not finish any better than 19th while driving the car and after he failed to qualify for the Coca-Cola 600, he was replaced by Loy Allen Jr. Several weeks later, he signed up with another new team Midwest Transit Racing, replacing rookie Dan Pardus in the No. 50 and finished the season with them. Craven returned to the team in 2000 but after failing to qualify for four of the first nine races of the season, the team switched to a part-time schedule. Following this decision, Craven had four Top 20 finishes but finished 44th in points.

In January the next year, it was announced that Craven would replace Scott Pruett in PPI Motorsports's No. 32 Ford. He won the pole in the summer race at Michigan International Speedway and in the Old Dominion 500 at Martinsville Speedway, he held off Dale Jarrett in the closing laps for his first career Winston Cup win. In 2002, he won two poles, scored nine Top 10 finishes, and finished a career-best 15th in points. In 2003, his team switched from Ford to Pontiac, providing the No. 32 car with a factory-backed engine program. In the Carolina Dodge Dealers 400 at Darlington Raceway, he battled Kurt Busch for the win, defeating him by .002 seconds in what was voted in December 2009 as the "Finish of the 2000s" in the Sprint Cup Series. In that race, he became the last person to win in a Pontiac. Craven failed to win races again that season and dropped 12 spots in the points standings. After he did not post a single Top 10 finish three-quarters of the way through 2004, he was replaced by Bobby Hamilton Jr., and only returned to run at New Hampshire Motor Speedway, his home track. His last Cup start was the 2004 EA Sports 500 at Talladega, where he drove in a development car for Joe Gibbs Racing, the No. 11 Chevrolet.

In 2005, Craven moved to the Craftsman Truck Series to drive the No. 99 Ford for Roush Racing. Craven was second in points after 9 races, and there was talk about him being promoted to Mark Martin's No. 6 Nextel Cup ride for 2006. However, a brutal stretch of finishes led to a free fall in the point standings, and it was announced that he would be gone from Roush at the end of the year. Craven did win at Martinsville Speedway late in the year, and finished fourteenth in points.

His final NASCAR start came at the Goody's 250 at Martinsville in the Busch Series for FitzBradshaw Racing in 2006. He finished 39th after the brakes failed on his No. 14 Dodge.

Post-retirement
He eventually retired and worked for ESPN and Yahoo! Sports as a NASCAR analyst. In January 2019, he departed ESPN after 12 full years with the network to work for Fox. Craven later left Fox at the conclusion of the 2020 season to pursue a new Ricky Craven Motorsports venture. He had previously owned a motorsports dealership by that name in Belfast, Maine.

Motorsports career results

NASCAR
(key) (Bold – Pole position awarded by qualifying time. Italics – Pole position earned by points standings or practice time. * – Most laps led.)

Winston Cup Series

Daytona 500

Busch Series

Craftsman Truck Series

Winston West Series

References

Ricky Craven Biography
Homestead-Miami 2003 Trackside Report
Family, the outdoors bigger now for Craven
End to Ricky and yahoo sports.

External links
Official Website

Ricky Craven Fan Club Archive Website
Ricky Craven ESPN Bio
 

Living people
1966 births
People from Penobscot County, Maine
Racing drivers from Maine
NASCAR drivers
American Speed Association drivers
Hampden Academy alumni
Hendrick Motorsports drivers
Richard Childress Racing drivers
Joe Gibbs Racing drivers
RFK Racing drivers